= Ahmed Refaai =

Egyptian footballer (born 2003)

Ahmed Refaai (Arabic: أحمد رفاعي; born 25 May 2003) is an Egyptian professional footballer who plays as a defender for Egyptian Premier League club Zamalek.
